The Platinum Party of Employers Who Think and Act to Increase Awareness, commonly shortened to the Platinum Party, was a minor political party in British Columbia, Canada.

It nominated eleven candidates in the 2005 BC election, who won a total of 779 votes (0.04% of the provincial total). None were elected. Stephen Christopher Davis was the party's most successful candidate, winning 179 votes (0.71% of the provincial vote) in Fort Langley-Aldergrove. Two of its candidates received fewer than 20 votes.

It did not nominate candidates in the 2009 election, and nominated two candidates in the 2013 election.  	

The party's interim leader was Espavo Sozo. Its previous leader was Jeff Robert Evans.

The party's aim was to ensure that the Government of British Columbia has in place the procedures necessary to maintain a legitimate position of authority over the commercial sector in BC. In particular, it sought to ensure that the government's employees have sworn and signed an oath; deposited a security, money, property, or bond with or without securities; and are covered by a lawful liability insurance carrier. The party argued that without the above, no agent can lawfully claim to perform the duties with which they have been empowered. It was also concerned that there is a lack of adequate checks and balances where a government employee is cited for civil abuse.

The party was a single issue party: it does not maintain policies on any other issues.

See also
List of British Columbia political parties

External links

Provincial political parties in British Columbia
Defunct political parties in Canada
Single-issue political parties
Organizations based in Victoria, British Columbia
Political parties established in 2005
2005 establishments in British Columbia